Tingena contextella is a species of moth in the family Oecophoridae. It is endemic to New Zealand and has found in the North and South Islands. The larvae of this species feed on leaf litter.

Taxonomy 
This species was first described by Frances Walker in 1864 using specimen collected by T. R. Oxley in Nelson. In 1915 Meyrick placed this species within the Borkhausenia genus and synonymised it with Borkhausenia plagiatella.  George Hudson discussed this species as a synonym of  B. plagiatella in his 1928 publication The butterflies and moths of New Zealand. In 1988 J. S. Dugdale removed this species from this synonymy and placed this species in the genus Tingena. The male lectotype is held at the Natural History Museum, London.

Description 
Walker described this species as follows:

Distribution 
This species is endemic to New Zealand and has been observed in not just the type locality of Nelson but also in the Wellington region.

Behaviour 
The larvae of this species feed on leaf litter.

References

Oecophoridae
Moths of New Zealand
Moths described in 1864
Endemic fauna of New Zealand
Taxa named by Francis Walker (entomologist)
Endemic moths of New Zealand